Effler is a community in McDowell County, West Virginia, United States. Effler was incorporated into the town of Anawalt.

References

Geography of McDowell County, West Virginia
Neighborhoods in West Virginia